A Segal–Cover score is an attempt to measure the "perceived qualifications and ideology" of nominees to the United States Supreme Court. The scores are created by analyzing pre-confirmation newspaper editorials regarding the nominations from The New York Times, Washington Post, Chicago Tribune, Los Angeles Times, St. Louis Post-Dispatch, and The Wall Street Journal. Each nominee receives two scores that range from 0 to 1 based on the average score of all articles from these sources:

 Qualifications: 0 means unqualified and 1 means extremely qualified
 Qualification scores are based on the characterization of each editorial as positive, neutral, or negative toward the nominee. Positive articles are coded as 1, neutral articles as 0.5, and negative articles as 0.
 Ideology: 0 means most conservative, and 1 means most liberal.
 Ideology scores are based on each editorial's characterization of the nominee as liberal, moderate, conservative, or not applicable. Articles characterizing the nominee as liberal are coded as 1, moderate as .5, conservative as 0; articles deemed not applicable are omitted from the ideology score.
The Segal–Cover scoring was introduced by Jeffrey Segal and Albert Cover (both of Stony Brook University) in their 1989 article "Ideological Values and the Votes of U.S. Supreme Court Justices". The scores have been updated by Segal to cover all nominees from Hugo Black in 1937 to Brett Kavanaugh in 2018.

Segal and Cover found that the scores are strongly correlated with the subsequent votes of the justices. Because the scores are based on perceptions before the nominee takes a seat on the Court, they also provide "reliable measures of the ideological values of Supreme Court justices that are independent of the votes they later cast." In a 1995 paper revisiting the Segal-Cover score, Segal and his coauthors concluded that the ideology score was significantly more accurate for justices who served during and after the Warren Court and cautioned that researchers analyzing the ideology of earlier justices should supplement the ideology scores of earlier judges with other methodologies and that "Scholars should be sensitive to changes in the legal, political, and social environments (which generate the newspaper reactions on which the scores are based) and use appropriate diagnostic tools to tease out their potential effects."

The Segal–Cover perceived qualifications and ideology scores for all nominees to the Court between 1937 and 2018:

* The vote on Fortas for the Chief Justice position was on cloture and failed to receive the necessary two-thirds majority.

A highlighted row indicates that the Justice is currently serving on the Court.

A Senate vote in red text indicates that the nomination was blocked.

See also 

 Ideological leanings of United States Supreme Court justices
 Judicial Common Space
 Supreme Court of the United States

References 

Supreme Court of the United States
Political spectrum
Rating